Robert Lee Flowers (November 6, 1870 – August 24, 1951) served as president of Duke University from 1941 to 1948. Flowers graduated from the U.S. Naval Academy and worked for Trinity College as a professor in electrical engineering and mathematics before becoming an administrator.  He served the university for over sixty years – holding the positions of Treasurer, Vice-President, President, and Chancellor.

Flowers was first employed as instructor for Trinity while the college was still in Randolph County. As an engineer, one of his first responsibilities was to wire the new buildings in Durham for electricity after the move in 1892. Affectionately known by students and alumni as "Professor Bobby Flowers," he was named president of Duke University following the death of President Few in 1941. His experience and stature were welcome because the demands of a world at war and the strains of transition to a peacetime economy dominated every aspect of university life during his presidency. In 1948, he stepped down as president and served as chancellor until 1951.

References

External links
 Duke's Presidents
 Robert Lee Flowers Records, 1891-1968 University Archives, Duke University

1870 births
1951 deaths
Presidents of Duke University
Duke University faculty
United States Naval Academy alumni